Cuphodes plexigrapha is a moth of the family Gracillariidae. It is known from Bihar and Tamil Nadu, India.

The larvae feed on Caesalpinia species, including Cajanus cajan and Cajanus indicus. They probably mine the leaves of their host plant.

References

Cuphodes
Moths of Asia
Moths described in 1916